Zeynep Çamcı (born December 11, 1986) is a Turkish actress and screenwriter. She is best known for hit surreal comedy series Leyla ile Mecnun and popular youth series Beni Böyle Sev. She won the 2013 Best Actress Award at the International Antalya Film Festival for her role in the movie Meryem.

Filmography

References

External links 
 
 Zeynep Çamcı in Sinemalar
 Zeynep Çamcı in IMDd
 
 Zeynep Çamcı in SinemaTürk

1986 births
Living people
People from Bodrum
Turkish film actresses
Best Actress Golden Orange Award winners
21st-century Turkish actresses